Glasterlaw railway station served the area of Glasterlaw, Angus, Scotland from 1848 to 1956 on the Aberdeen Railway.

History 
The station opened on 1 February 1848 by the Aberdeen Railway. The goods yard was to the north. The station closed to passengers on 2 April 1951 and to goods traffic on 11 June 1956.

References

External links 

Disused railway stations in Angus, Scotland
Former Caledonian Railway stations
Railway stations in Great Britain opened in 1848
Railway stations in Great Britain closed in 1951
1848 establishments in Scotland
1956 disestablishments in Scotland